BBC Radio 2 Country was a pop-up DAB service from the BBC which launched at 12:00 on Thursday 5 March 2015. The station covered the Country2Country Festival and was on air for the festival's duration.

On its debut, the station broadcast for twelve hours each day until Sunday 8 March 2015. It was relaunched for the 2016 festival, held between 10 March 2016 and 13 March 2016, and again from 9 March 2017 to 12 March 2017.

The station did not return after the 2017 festival and has not returned since.

Presenters

Special Programmes 
A number of famous country singers have presented one-off shows for Radio 2 Country or have given hour-long interviews to be broadcast on the station:

 Live from Country to Country - presented by Bob Harris, Jo Whiley, Patrick Kielty, Alex Lester, Paul Sexton, Baylen Leonard and Bobbie Pryor (2015–present)
 C2C Unplugged - presented by Bob Harris (2015–16)
 Patrick Kielty meets Garth Brooks (2015)
 Bob Harris meets Miranda Lambert (2015)
 Johnnie Walker meets Dolly (2015)
 Taking back the country - presented by Wynonna Judd (2015)
 Country Duos - presented by Kristian Bush of Sugarland (2015)
 Songwriters - presented by Trisha Yearwood (2015)
 Classic Country - presented by Suzy Bogguss (2015)
 Loretta Lynn in conversation - presented by Bob Harris (2016)
 Gospel Hour - presented by Hillary Scott of Lady Antebellum (2016) and Reba McEntire (2017)
 On the road with Little Big Town (2016)
 Sad songs make me happy - presented by Gretchen Peters (2016)
 Country Playlist - presented by The Shires (2017)
 Bluegrass and beyond - presented by Alison Krauss (2017)
 Country Pickers - presented by Marty Stuart (2017)

See also 
 BBC Radio 2 Eurovision
 BBC Music Jazz
 BBC Radio 2 50s

References

External links 

 
 Media UK's BBC Radio 2 site including scheduled programming

 
Country
Radio stations established in 2015
Radio stations disestablished in 2017
Adult contemporary radio stations in the United Kingdom
2015 establishments in the United Kingdom
2017 disestablishments in the United Kingdom
Digital-only radio stations
Defunct radio stations in the United Kingdom
Country radio stations in the United Kingdom